In the geologic timescale, the Sakmarian is an age or stage of the Permian. It is a subdivision of the Cisuralian Epoch or Series. The Sakmarian lasted between 293.52 and  million years ago (Ma). It was preceded by the Asselian and followed by the Artinskian.

Stratigraphy
The Sakmarian Stage is named after the Sakmara River in the Ural Mountains, a tributary to the Ural River. The stage was introduced into scientific literature by Alexander Karpinsky in 1874. In Russian stratigraphy, it originally formed a substage of the Artinskian Stage. Currently, the ICS uses it as an independent stage in its international geologic timescale.

The base of the Sakmarian Stage is laid with the first appearance of conodont species Streptognathodus postfusus in the fossil record. A global reference profile for the base (a GSSP), located in the southern Ural Mountains, Russia, was ratified in 2018. The top of the Sakmarian (the base of the Artinskian) is defined as the place in the stratigraphic record where fossils of conodont species Sweetognathus whitei and Mesogondolella bisselli first appear.

References

External links 
 GeoWhen Database - Sakmarian
 Upper Paleozoic stratigraphic chart at the website of the subcommission for stratigraphic information of the ICS

Permian geochronology
 
.